This is a list of the mammal species recorded in Togo. Of the mammal species in Togo, four are endangered, eight are vulnerable, and three are near threatened.

The following tags are used to highlight each species' conservation status as assessed by the International Union for Conservation of Nature:

Some species were assessed using an earlier set of criteria. Species assessed using this system have the following instead of near threatened and least concern categories:

Order: Hyracoidea (hyraxes) 

The hyraxes are any of four species of fairly small, thickset, herbivorous mammals in the order Hyracoidea. About the size of a domestic cat they are well-furred, with rounded bodies and a stumpy tail. They are native to Africa and the Middle East.

Family: Procaviidae (hyraxes)
Genus: Dendrohyrax
 Western tree hyrax, D. dorsalis 
Genus: Procavia
 Cape hyrax, P. capensis

Order: Proboscidea (elephants) 

The elephants comprise three living species and are the largest living land animals.
Family: Elephantidae (elephants)
Genus: Loxodonta
African forest elephant, L. cyclotis

Order: Sirenia (manatees and dugongs) 

Sirenia is an order of fully aquatic, herbivorous mammals that inhabit rivers, estuaries, coastal marine waters, swamps, and marine wetlands. All four species are endangered.

Family: Trichechidae
Genus: Trichechus
 African manatee, T. senegalensis

Order: Primates 

The order Primates contains humans and their closest relatives: lemurs, lorisoids, tarsiers, monkeys, and apes.

Suborder: Strepsirrhini
Infraorder: Lorisiformes
Family: Lorisidae (lorises, bushbabies)
Genus: Perodicticus
 Potto, Perodicticus potto LR/lc
Family: Galagidae
Genus: Galagoides
 Prince Demidoff's bushbaby, Galagoides demidovii LR/lc
Genus: Galago
 Senegal bushbaby, Galago senegalensis LR/lc
Suborder: Haplorhini
Infraorder: Simiiformes
Parvorder: Catarrhini
Superfamily: Cercopithecoidea
Family: Cercopithecidae (Old World monkeys)
Genus: Erythrocebus
 Patas monkey, Erythrocebus patas LR/lc
Genus: Chlorocebus
 Tantalus monkey, Chlorocebus tantalus LR/lc
Genus: Cercopithecus
 Diana monkey, Cercopithecus diana EN
 White-throated guenon, Cercopithecus erythrogaster EN
 Mona monkey, Cercopithecus mona LR/lc
 Greater spot-nosed monkey, Cercopithecus nictitans LR/lc
 Lesser spot-nosed monkey, Cercopithecus petaurista LR/lc
Genus: Papio
 Olive baboon, Papio anubis LR/lc
Subfamily: Colobinae
Genus: Colobus
 King colobus, Colobus polykomos LR/nt
 Ursine colobus, Colobus vellerosus VU
Genus: Procolobus
 Olive colobus, Procolobus verus LR/nt
Superfamily: Hominoidea
Family: Hominidae (great apes)
Subfamily: Homininae
Tribe: Hominini
Subtribe: Hominina
Genus: Homo
 Human, Homo sapiens LR/lc
Subtribe: Chimpanzee
Genus: Pan
 Common chimpanzee, Pan troglodytes EN

Order: Rodentia (rodents) 

Rodents make up the largest order of mammals, with over 40% of mammalian species. They have two incisors in the upper and lower jaw which grow continually and must be kept short by gnawing.

Suborder: Hystricognathi
Family: Hystricidae (Old World porcupines)
Genus: Atherurus
 African brush-tailed porcupine, Atherurus africanus LC
Genus: Hystrix
 Crested porcupine, Hystrix cristata LC
Family: Thryonomyidae (cane rats)
Genus: Thryonomys
 Greater cane rat, Thryonomys swinderianus LC
Suborder: Sciurognathi
Family: Anomaluridae
Subfamily: Anomalurinae
Genus: Anomalurops
 Beecroft's scaly-tailed squirrel, Anomalurops beecrofti LC
Family: Sciuridae (squirrels)
Subfamily: Xerinae
Tribe: Xerini
Genus: Xerus
 Striped ground squirrel, Xerus erythropus LC
Tribe: Protoxerini
Genus: Funisciurus
 Red-cheeked rope squirrel, Funisciurus leucogenys DD
 Kintampo rope squirrel, Funisciurus substriatus DD
Genus: Heliosciurus
 Gambian sun squirrel, Heliosciurus gambianus LC
 Red-legged sun squirrel, Heliosciurus rufobrachium LC
Genus: Protoxerus
 Forest giant squirrel, Protoxerus stangeri LC
Family: Gliridae (dormice)
Subfamily: Graphiurinae
Genus: Graphiurus
 Jentink's dormouse, Graphiurus crassicaudatus DD
Family: Nesomyidae
Subfamily: Dendromurinae
Genus: Dendromus
 Banana climbing mouse, Dendromus messorius LC
Genus: Steatomys
 Northwestern fat mouse, Steatomys caurinus LC
Subfamily: Cricetomyinae
Genus: Cricetomys
 Emin's pouched rat, Cricetomys emini LC
 Gambian pouched rat, Cricetomys gambianus LC
Family: Muridae (mice, rats, voles, gerbils, hamsters, etc.)
Subfamily: Leimacomyinae
Genus: Leimacomys
 Togo mouse, Leimacomys buettneri DD
Subfamily: Deomyinae
Genus: Acomys
 Johan's spiny mouse, Acomys johannis LC
Genus: Lophuromys
 Rusty-bellied brush-furred rat, Lophuromys sikapusi LC
Genus: Uranomys
 Rudd's mouse, Uranomys ruddi LC
Subfamily: Gerbillinae
Genus: Tatera
 Kemp's gerbil, Tatera kempi LC
Genus: Taterillus
 Gracile tateril, Taterillus gracilis LC
Subfamily: MurinaeGenus: Arvicanthis Sudanian grass rat, Arvicanthis ansorgei LC
 African grass rat, Arvicanthis niloticus LC
 Guinean grass rat, Arvicanthis rufinus LC
Genus: Dasymys West African shaggy rat, Dasymys rufulus LC
Genus: Hylomyscus Allen's wood mouse, Hylomyscus alleni LC
Genus: Lemniscomys Typical striped grass mouse, Lemniscomys striatus LC
 Heuglin's striped grass mouse, Lemniscomys zebra LC
Genus: Mastomys Guinea multimammate mouse, Mastomys erythroleucus LC
 Natal multimammate mouse, Mastomys natalensis LC
Genus: Mus Matthey's mouse, Mus mattheyi LC
 African pygmy mouse, Mus minutoides LC
 Peters's mouse, Mus setulosus LC
Genus: Praomys Dalton's mouse, Praomys daltoni LC
 Deroo's mouse, Praomys derooi LC
 Tullberg's soft-furred mouse, Praomys tullbergi LC
Genus: Stochomys Target rat, Stochomys longicaudatus LC

 Order: Lagomorpha (lagomorphs) 

The lagomorphs comprise two families, Leporidae (hares and rabbits), and Ochotonidae (pikas). Though they can resemble rodents, and were classified as a superfamily in that order until the early 20th century, they have since been considered a separate order. They differ from rodents in a number of physical characteristics, such as having four incisors in the upper jaw rather than two.

Family: Leporidae (rabbits, hares)
Genus: Lepus Cape hare, Lepus capensis LR/lc

 Order: Erinaceomorpha (hedgehogs and gymnures) 

The order Erinaceomorpha contains a single family, Erinaceidae, which comprise the hedgehogs and gymnures. The hedgehogs are easily recognised by their spines while gymnures look more like large rats.

Family: Erinaceidae (hedgehogs)
Subfamily: Erinaceinae
Genus: Atelerix Four-toed hedgehog, Atelerix albiventris LR/lc

 Order: Soricomorpha (shrews, moles, and solenodons) 

The "shrew-forms" are insectivorous mammals. The shrews and solenodons closely resemble mice while the moles are stout-bodied burrowers.

Family: Soricidae (shrews)
Subfamily: Crocidurinae
Genus: Crocidura Crosse's shrew, Crocidura crossei LC
 Fox's shrew, Crocidura foxi LC
 Bicolored musk shrew, Crocidura fuscomurina LC
 Large-headed shrew, Crocidura grandiceps NT
 Lamotte's shrew, Crocidura lamottei LC
 Nigerian shrew, Crocidura nigeriae LC
 African giant shrew, Crocidura olivieri LC
 Fraser's musk shrew, Crocidura poensis LC
 Voi shrew, Crocidura voi LC
Genus: Sylvisorex Climbing shrew, Sylvisorex megalura LC

 Order: Chiroptera (bats) 

The bats' most distinguishing feature is that their forelimbs are developed as wings, making them the only mammals capable of flight. Bat species account for about 20% of all mammals.

Family: Pteropodidae (flying foxes, Old World fruit bats)
Subfamily: Pteropodinae
Genus: Eidolon Straw-coloured fruit bat, Eidolon helvum LC
Genus: Epomophorus Gambian epauletted fruit bat, Epomophorus gambianus LC
Genus: Epomops Franquet's epauletted fruit bat, Epomops franqueti LC
Genus: Hypsignathus Hammer-headed bat, Hypsignathus monstrosus LC
Genus: Lissonycteris Smith's fruit bat, Lissonycteris smithi LC
Genus: Micropteropus Peters's dwarf epauletted fruit bat, Micropteropus pusillus LC
Genus: Myonycteris Little collared fruit bat, Myonycteris torquata LC
Genus: Nanonycteris Veldkamp's dwarf epauletted fruit bat, Nanonycteris veldkampi LC
Genus: Rousettus Egyptian fruit bat, Rousettus aegyptiacus LC
Subfamily: Macroglossinae
Genus: Megaloglossus Woermann's bat, Megaloglossus woermanni LC
Family: Vespertilionidae
Subfamily: Myotinae
Genus: Myotis Rufous mouse-eared bat, Myotis bocagii LC
Subfamily: Vespertilioninae
Genus: Glauconycteris Abo bat, Glauconycteris poensis LC
 Butterfly bat, Glauconycteris variegata LC
Genus: Mimetillus Moloney's mimic bat, Mimetillus moloneyi LC
Genus: Neoromicia Cape serotine, Neoromicia capensis LC
 Tiny serotine, Neoromicia guineensis LC
 Banana pipistrelle, Neoromicia nanus LC
 Somali serotine, Neoromicia somalicus LC
Genus: Nycticeinops Schlieffen's bat, Nycticeinops schlieffeni LC
Genus: Scotophilus African yellow bat, Scotophilus dinganii LC
 White-bellied yellow bat, Scotophilus leucogaster LC
 Schreber's yellow bat, Scotophilus nigrita NT
 Greenish yellow bat, Scotophilus viridis LC
Family: Molossidae
Genus: Chaerephon Lappet-eared free-tailed bat, Chaerephon major LC
 Nigerian free-tailed bat, Chaerephon nigeriae LC
 Little free-tailed bat, Chaerephon pumila LC
Genus: Mops Sierra Leone free-tailed bat, Mops brachypterus LC
 Angolan free-tailed bat, Mops condylurus LC
 Midas free-tailed bat, Mops midas LC
 Spurrell's free-tailed bat, Mops spurrelli LC
Family: Emballonuridae
Genus: Coleura African sheath-tailed bat, Coleura afra LC
Genus: Taphozous Mauritian tomb bat, Taphozous mauritianus LC
 Naked-rumped tomb bat, Taphozous nudiventris LC
Family: Nycteridae
Genus: Nycteris Bate's slit-faced bat, Nycteris arge LC
 Gambian slit-faced bat, Nycteris gambiensis LC
 Large slit-faced bat, Nycteris grandis LC
 Hairy slit-faced bat, Nycteris hispida LC
 Large-eared slit-faced bat, Nycteris macrotis LC
 Dwarf slit-faced bat, Nycteris nana LC
 Egyptian slit-faced bat, Nycteris thebaica LC
Family: Megadermatidae
Genus: Lavia Yellow-winged bat, Lavia frons LC
Family: Rhinolophidae
Subfamily: Rhinolophinae
Genus: Rhinolophus Halcyon horseshoe bat, Rhinolophus alcyone LC
 Rüppell's horseshoe bat, Rhinolophus fumigatus LC
 Lander's horseshoe bat, Rhinolophus landeri LC
Subfamily: Hipposiderinae
Genus: Hipposideros Aba roundleaf bat, Hipposideros abae NT
 Benito roundleaf bat, Hipposideros beatus LC
 Sundevall's roundleaf bat, Hipposideros caffer LC
 Cyclops roundleaf bat, Hipposideros cyclops LC
 Giant roundleaf bat, Hipposideros gigas LC
 Noack's roundleaf bat, Hipposideros ruber LC

 Order: Pholidota (pangolins) 

The order Pholidota comprises the eight species of pangolin. Pangolins are anteaters and have the powerful claws, elongated snout and long tongue seen in the other unrelated anteater species.
Family: Manidae
Genus: ManisGiant pangolin, S. gigantea 
Genus: PhataginusLong-tailed pangolin, P. tetradactyla 
Tree pangolin, P. tricuspis 

 Order: Cetacea (whales) 

The order Cetacea includes whales, dolphins and porpoises. They are the mammals most fully adapted to aquatic life with a spindle-shaped nearly hairless body, protected by a thick layer of blubber, and forelimbs and tail modified to provide propulsion underwater.

Suborder: Mysticeti
Family: Balaenopteridae
Subfamily: Balaenopterinae
Genus: Balaenoptera Common minke whale, Balaenoptera acutorostrata VU
 Sei whale, Balaenoptera borealis EN
 Bryde's whale, Balaenoptera brydei EN
 Blue whale, Balaenoptera musculus EN
 Fin whale, Balaenoptera physalus EN
Subfamily: Megapterinae
Genus: Megaptera Humpback whale, Megaptera novaeangliae VU
Suborder: Odontoceti
Superfamily: Platanistoidea
Family: Phocoenidae
Genus: Phocoena Harbour porpoise, Phocoena phocoena VU
Family: Physeteridae
Genus: Physeter Sperm whale, Physeter macrocephalus VU
Family: Kogiidae
Genus: Kogia Pygmy sperm whale, Kogia breviceps DD
 Dwarf sperm whale, Kogia sima DD
Family: Ziphidae
Genus: Mesoplodon Blainville's beaked whale, Mesoplodon densirostris DD
 Gervais' beaked whale, Mesoplodon europaeus DD
Genus: Ziphius Cuvier's beaked whale, Ziphius cavirostris DD
Family: Delphinidae (marine dolphins)
Genus: Orcinus Killer whale, Orcinus orca DD
Genus: Feresa Pygmy killer whale, Feresa attenuata DD
Genus: Pseudorca False killer whale, Pseudorca crassidens DD
Genus: Delphinus Short-beaked common dolphin, Delphinus delphis LR/cd
 Long-beaked common dolphin, Delphinus capensis DD
Genus: Sousa Atlantic humpback dolphin, Sousa teuszii  DD
Genus: Lagenodelphis Fraser's dolphin, Lagenodelphis hosei DD
Genus: Stenella Pantropical spotted dolphin, Stenella attenuata LR/cd
 Clymene dolphin, Stenella clymene DD
 Striped dolphin, Stenella coeruleoalba DD
 Atlantic spotted dolphin, Stenella frontalis DD
 Spinner dolphin, Stenella longirostris LR/cd
Genus: Steno Rough-toothed dolphin, Steno bredanensis DD
Genus: Tursiops Common bottlenose dolphin, Tursiops truncatus LC
Genus: Globicephala Short-finned pilot whale, Globicephala macrorhynchus DD
Genus: Grampus Risso's dolphin, Grampus griseus DD
Genus: Peponocephala Melon-headed whale, Peponocephala electra DD

 Order: Carnivora (carnivorans) 

There are over 260 species of carnivorans, the majority of which feed primarily on meat. They have a characteristic skull shape and dentition. 
Suborder: Feliformia
Family: Felidae (cats)
Subfamily: Felinae
Genus: Acinonyx Cheetah, A. jubatus VU presence uncertain
Genus: CaracalCaracal, C. caracal 
African golden cat, C. aurata  presence uncertain
Genus: Leptailurus Serval, Leptailurus serval LC
Family: Viverridae
Subfamily: Viverrinae
Genus: GenettaCommon genet, G. genetta 
Rusty-spotted genet, G. maculata 
 Hausa genet, G. thierryi LC
Family: Nandiniidae
Genus: Nandinia African palm civet, Nandinia binotataFamily: Herpestidae (mongooses)
Genus: Herpestes Egyptian mongoose, Herpestes ichneumon LC
Common slender mongoose, Herpestes sanguineus LC
Genus: Mungos Gambian mongoose, Mungos gambianus DD
Family: Hyaenidae (hyaenas)
Genus: CrocutaSpotted hyena, C. crocuta  possibly extirpated
Suborder: Caniformia
Family: Canidae (dogs, foxes)
Genus: Lycaon African wild dog, L. pictus  possibly extirpated
Family: Mustelidae (mustelids)
Genus: Ictonyx Striped polecat, Ictonyx striatus LC
Genus: MellivoraHoney badger, M. capensis 
Genus: Hydrictis Speckle-throated otter, H. maculicollis NT possibly extirpated

 Order: Artiodactyla (even-toed ungulates) 

The even-toed ungulates are ungulates whose weight is borne about equally by the third and fourth toes, rather than mostly or entirely by the third as in perissodactyls. There are about 220 artiodactyl species, including many that are of great economic importance to humans.

Family: Suidae (pigs)
Subfamily: Phacochoerinae
Genus: Phacochoerus Common warthog, Phacochoerus africanus LR/lc
Subfamily: Suinae
Genus: Potamochoerus Red river hog, Potamochoerus porcus LR/lc
Family: Hippopotamidae (hippopotamuses)
Genus: Hippopotamus Hippopotamus, Hippopotamus amphibius VU
Family: Tragulidae
Genus: Hyemoschus Water chevrotain, Hyemoschus aquaticus DD
Family: Bovidae (cattle, antelope, sheep, goats)
Subfamily: Alcelaphinae
Genus: Alcelaphus Hartebeest, Alcelaphus buselaphus LR/cd
Genus: Damaliscus Topi, Damaliscus lunatus LR/cd
Subfamily: Antilopinae
Genus: Gazella Red-fronted gazelle, Gazella rufifrons VU
Genus: Ourebia Oribi, Ourebia ourebi LR/cd
Subfamily: Bovinae
Genus: Syncerus African buffalo, Syncerus caffer LR/cd
Genus: Tragelaphus Bongo, Tragelaphus eurycerus LR/nt
 Bushbuck, Tragelaphus scriptus LR/lc
 Sitatunga, Tragelaphus spekii LC possibly extirpated
Subfamily: Cephalophinae
Genus: Cephalophus Bay duiker, Cephalophus dorsalis LR/nt
 Maxwell's duiker, Cephalophus maxwellii LR/nt
 Blue duiker, Cephalophus monticola LR/lc
 Black duiker, Cephalophus niger LR/nt
 Red-flanked duiker, Cephalophus rufilatus LR/cd
 Yellow-backed duiker, Cephalophus silvicultor LR/nt
Genus: Sylvicapra Common duiker, Sylvicapra grimmia LR/lc
Subfamily: Hippotraginae
Genus: Hippotragus Roan antelope, Hippotragus equinus LR/cd
Subfamily: Reduncinae
Genus: Kobus Waterbuck, Kobus ellipsiprymnus LR/cd
 Kob, Kobus kob LR/cd
Genus: Redunca Bohor reedbuck, Redunca redunca LR/cd

 Extirpated 
The following species are locally extinct in the country:
Lion, Panthera leoLeopard, Panthera pardusGiant eland, Tragelaphus derbianus''

See also
List of chordate orders
Lists of mammals by region
List of prehistoric mammals
Mammal classification
List of mammals described in the 2000s

Notes

References
 

Togo
Togo
mammals
Mammals of West Africa